The Kia Soul is a subcompact car manufactured and marketed by Kia since 2008. Often described and marketed as a crossover since its introduction, the Soul is a hatchback with a boxy proportion and tall roof, which are designed to maximize its interior space. Despite its SUV-like styling, the Soul was never available with all-wheel drive, instead it is exclusively a front-wheel drive vehicle.

The Soul first appeared in 2006 in the form of a concept model displayed at the North American International Auto Show in Detroit. The production model made its debut at the Paris Motor Show in 2008. During its introduction, Kia stated that the Soul is aimed at the North American market, and targeted towards buyers in the 18 to 35-year old range.

The second-generation model was introduced in 2013 for the 2014 model year, which featured a larger exterior and interior dimensions along with a reworked chassis, while keeping its boxy styling. The Soul is currently in its third generation, which was introduced in 2018 for the 2019 model year. Since 2014, Kia has also marketed a battery electric variant as the Soul EV.

The name "Soul" comes from the homophone of Seoul, the city that hosts Kia's headquarters.



First generation (AM; 2008)

The first-generation Soul debuted at the 2008 Paris Motor Show and is manufactured in South Korea. Designed at Kia's design center in California, the Soul concept was styled by Mike Torpey in early 2005 under the leadership of Chief Design Officer Peter Schreyer. As a new member of Kia's Design Team in Irvine, California, Torpey was sent to Kia Korea to brainstorm a new vehicle. After seeing a television documentary on wild boars and learning of their importance in Korean culture, Torpey sketched a caricature of a boar wearing a backpack. The New York Times reported "the boar's attitude of strength and capability was the image [Torpey] wanted for a new model aimed at hip urban youths."

According to the Automotive News, the Soul had been criticized for a "plasticky" interior and a harsh ride. Both the ride quality and interior were upgraded during the first year of production.

Features
The interior features two front bucket seats and a rear flat-folding bench seat that can adjust to prioritize passenger or cargo volume.

The first generation was marketed with a six-speaker stereo system that includes a CD player, a USB port for iPod connection, and Sirius Satellite Radio.  Additional features available for upgrade included additional speakers, steering-wheel-mounted audio controls and Bluetooth for hands-free connectivity.

Options included themed special editions as well as 18-inch alloy wheels, cruise control, leather-wrapped steering wheel, racing stripes, "dragon" and "houndstooth" graphics, and LED turn indicators.

For 2011, the Soul was updated with more conventional pull-out door handles, standard metallic interior trim, redesigned instrument cluster, leather shift boot, and switchblade style fold-in integrated key and remote, with an optional Smart Key available in the Exclaim ("!") trim.

For model year 2012, the Soul received revised exterior and interior styling and new powertrains. In North America the updated 1.6 liter engine, featuring direct injection, makes 138 hp/123 lb-ft; the 2.0 liter engine makes 164 hp/148 lb-ft of torque. The 1.6 now delivers 25–26 mpg in the city and 30–31 on the highway. The 2.0 returns 23–24 in the city and 28–29 on the highway. New features included navigation, UVO infotainment, leather and heated seats and automatic climate control.

As part of the 2012 upgrades, European models were fitted with new 1.6-liter GDI gasoline or 1.6 CRDi diesel engines, both of which can be specified with an automatic gearbox or a new six-speed manual gearbox, replacing the five-speed unit in the old version. As a result, the gasoline offers a 14 bhp uplift in power compared to its predecessor, while returning improved fuel economy. The modified 1.6 CRDi diesel returns 57.6 mpg and has cut its CO2 emissions from 138  g/km to 129g/km – particularly important for the European market where taxation is based on carbon emissions.

The 2013 North American Soul received upgrades including 3 new colors, a bulged hood, revised grille with black chrome accents, LED red tail lights, LED amber front turn signals under the headlights and white LED running lights under the front turn signals. The exterior Kia badges became now smooth instead of raised lettering. Inside, audio controls were relocated to the steering wheel and Bluetooth became standard across the range. Upper trims included power folding heated mirrors with turn signal repeaters. The center display for sound system was previously red LED and was revised to include a full color range.

Special editions
Soul Denim (2010)

The Denim is a limited (1.200 units) version of 2010 Soul+ for the US market. Appearing in June 2009, it features a blue body color with white racing stripes, white painted side-view mirrors, and white, 18-inch, alloy wheels.

Soul Dragon (2010)

The Shadow Dragon edition is based on the Soul trim line and was limited to about 1,900 units. Exterior details include shadow black paint with matte-black dragon graphics on its hood and tailgate, gloss-black bumper inserts, a body-color rear wing and 18 inch black alloy wheels. The interior features heated, black leather trimmed seats.

The  Soul Tiger (2010)

The Soul White Tiger Special Edition comes with features such as Clear White with Grey exterior graphics, body colored bumpers, sport rear spoiler, black 18-inch alloy wheels, black fender vents with side marker repeater, rear bumper applique, alloy fuel door, black leather seat trim, heated front seats, leather wrapped steering wheel and shift knob, push button start with smart key, illuminated sill plates, automatic climate control and front fog lights.

Soul Flex (2010)

Kia presented the Soul Flex at the 2010 São Paulo International Auto Show. The Soul Flex is the first Korean flexible-fuel vehicle capable of running on any blend from E20-E25 gasoline (mandatory Brazilian blend) to E100 (neat ethanol). The new Soul Flex delivers a 44% improvement in fuel efficiency compared with the existing gasoline model, as well as superior power and torque.

Powertrain
The North American version of the Soul was initially available in 2010 and 2011 with one of two inline four-cylinder gasoline engines. The base model is powered by a 1.6-liter unit producing  and mated exclusively with a five-speed manual transmission. Higher trims feature a 2.0-liter unit producing  connected to a standard five-speed manual transmission with a four-speed automatic available as a stand-alone option. A 1.6-liter diesel engine producing  and  torque is offered in European models instead of the 2.0-liter gas, mated to a five-speed manual gearbox.

For the 2012 model, the Soul received two new transmissions and a new engine: 6-speed manual and 6-speed automatic transmissions replaced the old choices, and the new 2.0-liter Nu engine replacing the old Beta engine; the 1.6-liter Gamma engine remained as the base model choice. The Gamma 1.6 gets a new dual variable valve timing (128 HP), and in some countries, gets a direct injection fuel system.

Safety
The Soul earned a maximum five star safety rating from Euro NCAP. In 2009, According to Euro NCAP, the five star safety rating places Soul among the safest B-segment family cars in the world. The Soul was awarded the maximum five star safety rating by the Australasian New Car Assessment Program (ANCAP), but only on the New Zealand version. Australian versions get 4 out of 5 stars.

Euro NCAP test results for a LHD, 5-door hatchback variant on a 2009 registration:

Concepts
Soul Concept (2006)

The design of the Soul concept was based on the Kia Mesa concept and it was initially introduced as a compact crossover with a 5-door SUV body styling with five seats and suicide doors. It included a 2.0-liter I4 engine, 5-speed automatic transmission with manual shift capability and adaptive cruise control.

The vehicle was unveiled at the 2006 North American International Auto Show in Detroit, Michigan.

By late 2008, Kia announced it would put the car into production as a 2009 model.

Soul Burner, Diva, Searcher (2008)
The Soul Burner, Diva, and Searcher are concept vehicles, created by Kia's European design team, under the guidance of Kia's Chief Design Officer, Peter Schreyer.

The Soul Diva was created as a fashion accessory for a style-conscious young-at-heart woman, who regards her car to be as important as her entire outfit. It included a white, gold and black color scheme, full-length tinted glass panoramic roof, glossy black imitation leather, using 'quilted' stitching and trimmed to look like sofas, and black long-pile 'Pony-hide' carpet.

The Soul Burner was described as the 'bad boy' of Soul concepts. It included a solid roof panel and no roof rails, 245/40R19 tires, 4 bucket seats, and L-shaped day-light LED driving lamps around the outer edges. At the rear, two vertical exhaust pipes were placed at the extremes of the bumper.

Kia's Soul Searcher was designed to capture the spirit of Korean and Far Eastern culture, with a focus on achieving personal inner peace and creating a calm cocoon for the occupants. It included an old leather finish on the bonnet, powered folding roof, tailgate panel, dashboard, door panels and steering wheel rim, plus gray-beige felt floor and seats.

The Soul Hamstar Edition, introduced in 2011, featured body colored bumpers, rear sport spoiler, black 18-inch wheels, black fender vents w/side marker repeater, rear bumper applique, matte alloy fuel door, hamstar exterior graphics, black leather seating, heated seats, hamstar edition floor mats, smart key push button starting, automatic climate control, fog lights, and leather steering wheel and shift knob.

The vehicles were unveiled at the 2008 Geneva Motor Show. The Soul Burner later appeared at the 2008 SEMA show.

Soul Hybrid (2008)

The vehicle was unveiled at the 2008 Paris Motor Show and later at Auto Shanghai and later at the Canadian International Auto Show.

Soul'ster Concept (2009)

The Soul'ster is a concept vehicle with a 2-door, 4-seater cabriolet SUV body styling with an open roof over the rear seats. It includes dual chrome exhaust, polished aluminum exhaust tips featuring carbon-fiber interior sleeves, and 19-inch 5-spoke aluminum alloy wheels. It is similar to the Jeep Wrangler. The vehicle was unveiled at the 2009 NAIAS.

It went on sale in 2010.

Marketing

After the Soul's release, Kia USA launched commercials in a campaign titled "A new way to roll", created by Los Angeles-based ad agency David&Goliath, and featuring city streets with animated hamsters on stationary hamster wheels. The commercials have attracted popularity on video-sharing sites and were awarded "Automotive Ad of the Year" at the Nielsen Automotive Advertising Awards.

Featured songs include "Do What You Do" by Marz, "Fort Knox" by Goldfish, "Junkyard" by The Potbelleez, "colors" by Calvin Harris, "The Choice Is Yours (Revisited)" by Black Sheep, "Applause" by Lady Gaga and, during the 2011 MTV Video Music Awards, "Party Rock Anthem" by LMFAO.

A 2013 Soul commercial, released August 2012, featured the song "In My Mind (Axwell Remix)" by Ivan Gough, Feenixpawl and Georgi Kay with hamsters at an 18th-century opera house to the song.

In October 2011, the Kia Soul Hamsters were inducted into the Madison Avenue Walk of Fame, advertising industry's equivalent of Hollywood and Vine. As of 2011, Kia is also the only car manufacturer to be inducted. From 2010 to 2012, Kia released a series of commercials for the Soul featuring professional golfer Michelle Wie.

As an April Fool's Day joke, Kia published a press release on a new environmentally friendly concept based on the Soul in 2010, called the Air Propulsion and Retardation Installation Line. The concept used sensors on the bumpers and retractable panels to harness the flow of wind.

Reviews and awards
The Soul earned a Red Dot design award in 2009. In a Popular Mechanics comparison, the Soul surpassed the Nissan Cube and the Scion xB. Fifth Gear gave it a 4/5 rating, as did The Times and WhatCar?. The Soul was named to the Kelley Blue Book's '5 Great Deals' List, and recognized by the Texas Auto Writers Association as 'Best Value'.
 
The Soul was recognized on the "Coolest New Cars Under US $18,000" list by Kelley Blue Book's Kbb.com in 2009. The Soul'ster was also awarded 2009 Concept Truck of the Year and named to "Top 10 Back-to-School Cars" List by Kelley Blue Book's kbb.com. The Soul was named "Best Car 2009" by the Chilean daily newspaper La Tercera, and Kia Motors Chile was also selected as "Best Maker of the Year 2009" in Chile.

The Soul's residual value after three years was valued at 56 percent of the original value to take the top place in its segment in the Automotive Lease Guide's latest report. It surpassed the Nissan Cube and the Scion xB.

In 2010, the Soul was named by Time's as one of the "Most Exciting Cars of 2010". Also that year, the car was named one of "10 Great And Safe Rides For Teens" by Autoweek magazine, and was given the "2010 Automotive Excellence Award" By Popular Mechanics. In the same year, the Soul was also named "Small Car of the Year" by FAMA Magazine and 'Best Hatchback of 2010' by Cars.com. Edmunds.com named the Soul as one of the "Top Recommended" Vehicles for 2010.

Second generation (PS; 2013)

The redesign features a wraparound greenhouse, high-mounted tail lights, large trapezoidal lower air intake and "floating" body color panel set into the liftgate.

The second-generation Kia Soul shares its platform with the second generation Kia cee'd hatchback. 66 percent of the chassis utilizes either Ultra High Strength Steel (35 percent) or High Strength Steel (31 percent). The front subframe uses four bushings (the first generation has none) and the shock absorbers on the rear torsion beam axle are now mounted vertically allowing for more suspension travel.

The U.S. model went on sale as 2014 model year vehicle, and early models included a choice of 1.6-liter Gamma GDi or 2.0-liter Nu GDi engines, mated to 6-speed manual or 6-speed automatic transmissions.  Trim levels included base, + (Plus), and ! (Exclaim) models.

The European model was set to go on sale in early 2014, with UK launch in Spring 2014. Early models include a choice of 1.6-liter GDi gasoline or CRDi diesel engines (from the previous generation Kia Soul), six-speed manual or automatic transmission, three different roof colors (black, white, and red), a choice of 11 body colors. Korean market models received the same two engines, with the 2.0-liter gasoline engine currently reserved for North American buyers.

Kia Track'ster concept (2012) 
The Kia Track'ster concept is a 3-door concept subcompact crossover SUV which presaged the second generation Soul. The vehicle was unveiled at the 2012 Chicago Auto Show.

Facelift (2017)

For model year 2017, the Soul underwent a facelift. Included in the changes are some minor body trim changes, new paint colors, and new headlight options. The engine is mated to a 7-speed dual-clutch transmission, replacing the 6-speed automatic. The powertrain change resulted in the car being one of the fastest in its class.

In 2018, reports linked a large number of fires to the Soul in the United States. The Center for Auto Safety subsequently demanded Kia recall all Soul vehicles from 2010 through 2015 for fire hazard. Kia initiated a voluntary recall for fire risk on January 11, 2019, but the Soul was not included in the recall.

Special editions
"Red Line" edition (2014–)

The Red Line edition is a limited (2,000 units) version of 2014 Soul Plus with white body color, body kit with red accents, redesigned grille, front and rear fascias, and side skirts; custom 18-inch alloy wheels, 2.0-liter gasoline direct injected (GDI) four-cylinder engine, six-speed automatic transmission, black cloth seats with red stitching, leather steering wheel, black-leather dash hood with red stitching, black carpeted floor mats with red piping, sport pedals; shift knob ring, air vent ring, dash speakers and console tray trim in red.

Kia Soul EV (2015)

In 2013, Kia started testing prototype versions of a Soul electric vehicle based on the second-generation Soul. In November 2013, Kia announced they would be producing the Soul EV and it would go on sale in 2014.

The vehicle was first showcased at the Chicago Auto Show in February 2014 where Kia announced the Soul EV will be offered in California, Oregon, New York, New Jersey, and Maryland. Kia is targeting regions with the largest EV markets and infrastructure, and plans to offer the Soul EV in other markets in the near future.

Soul Autonomous Vehicle (2016)
Kia demonstrated their upcoming "Drive Wise" sub-brand at the 2016 Consumer Electronics Show with a Soul EV modified with Advanced Driver Assistance Systems (ADAS) technology.

Powertrain

Safety

Euro NCAP test results for a LHD, 5-door hatchback variant on a 2014 registration:

Marketing
Kia Motors once again teamed up with David&Goliath to promote the Soul using anthropomorphic hamster characters. The most recent commercial was for the Turbo model, featuring the Motörhead song "Ace of Spades".

Awards
The Soul won the 2014 Red Dot Award for Passenger Car Design and the iF Design Award for Discipline: Product in 2014 and Discipline: Communication in 2016.

Third generation (SK3; 2019)

Kia unveiled the third generation Soul and Soul EV (e-Soul in some markets) at the 2018 LA Auto Show. Unlike earlier models, it has thin lights as headlights, with the large grille remaining. A rugged X-Line trim was also added to the Soul's trim options. 

Initial models in the US include two options, including a turbocharged 1.6-liter engine and a naturally aspirated 2.0-liter engine. It will be both a gasoline model and an electric vehicle, with a "toughened chassis" for crash safety. The Soul now shares a platform with the Hyundai Kona.

The 2020 Soul and Soul EV were slated for release in North America in the second quarter of 2019. In the US, Kia postponed the launch of the Soul EV to 2021.

The Soul EV is the only version of this generation sold in Europe. It is now called e-Soul in most European markets, except for the UK. Distinguished with the name "Soul Booster," the 2020 Soul shares a 64-kWh battery pack and powertrain with the Niro.

In 2021, Kia discontinued the Soul in South Korea, due to poor sales and competition from the similarly sized Seltos. In the same year, the Soul started featuring the new Kia logo.

The 6-speed manual was discontinued in the United States for the 2022 model year. Previously, it was only offered on the base LX model.

Facelift (2023) 
For the 2023 model year, Kia updated the Soul, giving it revised headlights, taillights, front bumper, and rear fascia, along with new two-tone color combinations and new wheel designs. Along with the facelift, Kia discontinued the rugged-looking X-Line trim. Additionally, the turbo version was discontinued in the US, making the 2.0-liter Nu MPi naturally aspirated engine with CVT transmission the only available powertrain.

Engines

Marketing
Kia Motors collaborated with K-pop singer Hyolyn to promote the Soul.

Safety

Reviews 
U.S. News & World Report ranked the Kia Soul at No. 1 (tied with the Mazda CX-30 and Hyundai Kona) on its list of Best Subcompact SUVs for 2022, giving it a score of 8.4 out of 10.

Sales
As of 2015, Kia has produced over a million units of the Soul. In the United States, over 100,000 units have been sold each year from 2011 to 2018, becoming the best-selling subcompact car ahead of the Nissan Versa.

References

External links

2010s cars
Soul
Cars introduced in 2008
Mini sport utility vehicles
Crossover sport utility vehicles
Front-wheel-drive vehicles
Hybrid electric cars
Vehicles with CVT transmission
Euro NCAP small MPVs